Yatel FC is a Ni-Vanuatu football team based in Port Vila.

Achievements
None

Current squad

References

Football clubs in Vanuatu
Port Vila